An honor system or honesty system is a system by which parties in an interaction are expected to honor trust granted to them by other parties.

Honor system may also refer to:

 The Honor System (band), a Chicago-based punk rock group
 The Honor System (film), a 1917 film by Raoul Walsh
 Academic honor code, or honor system

See also
Honours system
:Category:Honours systems